Diácono João Luiz Pozzobon ("deacon João Luiz Pozzobon - Brazilian deacon") is a bairro in the District of Sede in the municipality of Santa Maria, in the Brazilian state of Rio Grande do Sul. It is located in east Santa Maria.

Villages 
The bairro contains the following villages: Conjunto Residencial Diácono João Luiz Pozzobon, Jardim Berleze, João Luiz Pozzobon, Loteamento Paróquia das Dores, Vila Cerrito, Vila Maringá.

Gallery of photos

References 

Bairros of Santa Maria, Rio Grande do Sul